Samuel Matete (born 27 July 1968 in Chingola) is a retired male track and field athlete from Zambia, who competed mainly in 400 metres hurdles.

Career
Noted for his exceptionally fast finish, he was one of the world's leading hurdlers in the early to mid-1990s, and became the first Zambian track and field world champion in 1991. This was the first time that an African athlete had won that event. He represented Zambia in the 400 m hurdles on four occasions (1988 to 2000) and was the silver medallist at the 1996 Atlanta Olympics.

His personal best of 47.10 seconds, achieved during the Weltklasse Zürich in 1991, is the current African record and ranks ninth on the all-time list.

Competition record

Personal bests
400 metres hurdles - 47.10 seconds (1991)
400 metres - 44.88 seconds (1991)
200 metres - 21.04 seconds (1989)
100 metres - 10.77 seconds (1989)

References

External links

1968 births
Living people
People from Chingola
Zambian male hurdlers
Olympic male hurdlers
Olympic athletes of Zambia
Olympic silver medalists for Zambia
Olympic silver medalists in athletics (track and field)
Athletes (track and field) at the 1988 Summer Olympics
Athletes (track and field) at the 1992 Summer Olympics
Athletes (track and field) at the 1996 Summer Olympics
Athletes (track and field) at the 2000 Summer Olympics
Medalists at the 1996 Summer Olympics
Commonwealth Games medallists in athletics
Commonwealth Games gold medallists for Zambia
Athletes (track and field) at the 1990 Commonwealth Games
Athletes (track and field) at the 1994 Commonwealth Games
Goodwill Games medalists in athletics
Competitors at the 1994 Goodwill Games
World Athletics Championships athletes for Zambia
World Athletics Championships medalists
World Athletics Championships winners
Japan Championships in Athletics winners
Auburn Tigers men's track and field athletes
Medallists at the 1994 Commonwealth Games